Os Brown (1889-1955) was an Australian rugby league footballer who played in the 1910s. He played for South Sydney in the New South Wales Rugby League (NSWRL) competition.

Playing career
Brown made his first grade debut for South Sydney in round one of the 1911 season against North Sydney at the Sydney Sports Ground. In the same year, he was selected for New South Wales and Metropolis.  

In 1914, he made 12 appearances for South Sydney as the club won the 1914 premiership.  Brown retired following the conclusion of the 1915 season.

References

1889 births
1955 deaths
South Sydney Rabbitohs players
Australian rugby league players
Rugby league players from Sydney
Rugby league wingers
Rugby league fullbacks
New South Wales rugby league team players